Vergennes  is a city located in the northwest quadrant of Addison County, Vermont, United States. The municipality is bordered by the towns of Ferrisburgh, Panton, and Waltham. As of the 2020 census, its population was 2,553. It is the smallest of Vermont's 10 cities in terms of population, though the city of Winooski has the smallest area. It was the first city chartered in the state of Vermont.

History
Vergennes was settled in 1766 by Donald MacIntosh. It was established as a city in 1788, the only one in Vermont not to have been first chartered as a town or independent village. Instead, intersecting portions of the pre-existing towns of New Haven, Panton, and Ferrisburg at the Otter Creek Falls were combined to form Vergennes. It is the smallest city by population in Vermont.

The city is named for Frenchman Charles Gravier, comte de Vergennes, who greatly aided the rebel colonial effort in the American Revolutionary War.

Here, Thomas Macdonough built and armed the fleet that defeated the British on Lake Champlain during the War of 1812. The Monkton Iron Company (which was at the time the largest iron works in the nation) manufactured the fittings for Macdonough's fleet, as well as most of the cannon shot used by the United States Army in the north. The ore used was mined in nearby Monkton.

Organizers chose a city form of municipal government in anticipation of developing the area as an industrial center. The Otter Creek Falls provided power for mills and factories, and the close access to the Lake Champlain waterway was ideal for transportation both north and south. Industry boomed in the late 19th century; in particular, shipping connected to the Champlain Canal and wood-finishing related to lumber imported from Canada. As railways supplanted and bypassed the canal system, manufacturing declined in the city. A railroad spur from Ferrisburgh to the base of the falls proved a failure, as the grades were too steep for practical operations.

Commercial decline continued in the 20th century, narrowing down to a few surviving companies. In the early years of the 21st century, a group of civic boosters and merchants improved the downtown area along Main Street and reconnected the city to its waterways. The resulting development, catering to tourists and transients, is hampered by centralization of land ownership and escalation of commercial rents.

In July 2022, Vergennes was reconnected to the national passenger rail network when Amtrak's Ethan Allen Express began serving Ferrisburgh–Vergennes station. The city had last seen passenger service in 1953, when the Rutland Railroad discontinued the Green Mountain Flyer (New York City - Montreal).

Geography

Otter Creek flows north through the town. In the middle of town is a  waterfall, with a large basin that occasionally floods.

Demographics

As of the census of 2010,  2,588 people, 979 households, and 632 families were residing in the city. The population density was 1,141.1 people per square mile (441.0/km2). The 1,032 housing units had an average density of 429.6 per square mile (166.0/km2). The racial makeup of the city was 92.8% White, 3.0% African American, 0.3% Native American, 0.9% Asian, 0.7% from other races, and 2.3% from two or more races. Hispanics or Latinos of any race were 2.6% of the population.

Of the 979 households, 34.3% had children under18 living with them, 48.8% were married couples living together, 11.6% had a female householder with no husband present, and 35.4% were not families. About 28.2% of all households were made up of individuals, and 12.5% had someone living alone who was 65 or older. The average household size was 2.47, and the average family size was 3.02.

In the city, the age distribution of the population was 28.4% under 18, 13.1% from 18 to 24, 27.8% from 25 to 44, 19.3% from 45 to 64, and 11.3% who were 65 or older. The median age was 33 years. For every 100 females, there were 100.4 males. For every 100 females 18 and over, there were 93.8 males.

The median income for a household in the city was $37,763, and for a family was $48,155. Males had a median income of $33,669 versus $20,527 for females. The per capita income for the city was $15,465. About 8.1% of families and 17.0% of the population were below the poverty line, including 8.5% of those under 18 and 16.0% of those 65 or over.

Economy
Collins Aerospace (formerly UTC Aerospace, BF Goodrich Aerospace, and Symonds Precision) is the major employer in the community.

Arts and culture
The city features the Vergennes Opera House, which has weekly events involving the community and special guests, bands, singers, politicians, and theater groups. The city has a library, the Bixby Memorial Free Library, which hosts a variety of events such as a book club, writing workshops, children's story hour, and a bridge club.

Education
Vergennes has four schools: Vergennes Union Elementary School,  Vergennes Union High School, Champlain Valley Christian School, and Northlands Job Corps Center, the former Vermont Industrial School, later known as the Weeks School, which served as an orphanage and juvenile-delinquent home until the late 1970s, in the same facility.

Vergennes Union High School also offers an alternative public program, the Walden Project, available to area students.

Infrastructure

Transportation
Vermont Route 22A runs through the city, and makes a junction with U.S. Highway 7 on the northern outskirts of Vergennes.

Amtrak's daily Ethan Allen Express train serves Ferrisburgh–Vergennes station, just north of the city. Other stops on the route include Burlington, Middlebury, Rutland, Albany, and New York City.

Notable people 

 Joseph K. Edgerton, US congressman from Indiana
 Frank L. Fish, associate justice of the Vermont Supreme Court
 Jabez G. Fitch, U.S. marshal for Vermont
 Margaret Foley, sculptor
 Ethan A. Hitchcock, US army officer and author
 Roswell Hopkins, Secretary of State of Vermont
 Charles B. Lawrence, chief justice of the Illinois Supreme Court
 Jeff Pidgeon,  American screenwriter, animator and voice actor at Pixar
 John Pierpoint, chief justice of the Vermont Supreme Court
 Henry Porter, pitcher with the Milwaukee Brewers, Brooklyn Grays, and Kansas City Cowboys
 Daniel H. Pulcifer, Wisconsin state assemblyman and mayor of Shawano, Wisconsin
 Samuel Strong, militia officer and mayor of Vergennes
 Enoch Woodbridge, chief justice of the Vermont Supreme Court
 Frederick E. Woodbridge, US congressman and mayor of Vergennes

References

External links
 Vergennes Vermont Official City Website

 
Cities in Vermont
Cities in Addison County, Vermont
Populated places established in 1766